Ehrenfest is a surname. Notable people with the surname include:

Paul Ehrenfest (1880-1933), Austrian physicist and mathematician
Ehrenfest equations
Ehrenfest model
Ehrenfest paradox
Ehrenfest theorem
32796 Ehrenfest
Tatjana Ehrenfest-Afanassjewa (1876-1964), Ukrainian-Russian mathematician, wife of Paul
Tanja van Aardenne-Ehrenfest (1905–1984), Austrian Dutch mathematician, daughter of Paul

See also 
Ehrenfeld (disambiguation)
Ehrenfels (disambiguation)
Ehrenbaum
Ehrenberg (disambiguation)
Ehrenburg (disambiguation)
Ehrenhaft
Ehrenpreis
Ehrenstein
Ehrenthal

German-language surnames